Surgujia is an Indo-Aryan language spoken in Chhattisgarh. It belongs to the Eastern Hindi subgroup.

Speakers
Surgujia is primarily spoken in Surguja, Jashpur, and Koriya districts of Chhattisgarh; and to a lesser extent in Raigarh and Korba.

Speakers of Surgujia have often been conflated with those of Chhattisgarhi. Furthermore, as is the case with many Hindi languages and other regional languages, Surgujia has often been subsumed under the all-encompassing bracket of Standard Hindi due to erroneous, arbitrary or politically-motivated categorisation.

Classification
It was previously regarded by many as a dialect of Chhattisgarhi, and was designated as such by the linguist George A. Grierson in his comprehensive Linguistic Survey of India. Indeed, Surgujia possesses a lexical similarity of 71%-76% with Chhattisgarhi, according to Ethnologue. In recent times, however, Surgujia has come to be recognised as a distinct dialect.

References

Indo-Aryan languages
Languages of India